Line 7 of the Hangzhou Metro is a metro line in Hangzhou. The line will be 47.48 km long and will run in a west–east direction between Wushan Square station in Shangcheng District and Jiangdong'er Road station in Qiantang District in the east, passing through downtown Hangzhou and providing transfers with multiple other lines in the system. The section between Olympic Sports Center Station and Jiangdong'er Road Station was opened on 30 December 2020, the remaining section opened on 1 April 2022.

Opening timeline

Stations
Legend
 - Operational
 - Under construction

See also
 Hangzhou Metro

References

07
Railway lines opened in 2020
2020 establishments in China
Standard gauge railways in China
Airport rail links in China